Bernard Wilson or Willson may refer to:

 Barney Wilson, head coach for the William & Mary Tribe men's basketball team
 Bernard Wilson (American football) (born 1970), former American football player
 Bernard Wilson (singer) (1946–2010), American R&B, funk and soul music vocalist
 Bernard Wilson (boxer), Grenadian Olympic boxer
 Bernard Willson (cricketer) (born 1935), English cricketer